Scannell is an Irish surname.

People
Notable people with the surname include:

Acting
 Brendan Scannell (born 1990), American actor and comedian
 Susan Scannell (born 1958), American actress
 Tony Scannell (born 1945), Irish actor

Politics and public service
 Daniel T. Scannell (1912–2000), American politician in New York state
 David S. Scannell (1820–1893), American public official in California
 John J. Scannell (1841–1918), American politician and first New York City Fire Commissioner

Sports
 Andy Scannell (1905–1959), Irish Gaelic footballer and hurler
 Billy Scannell (born 1999), Irish rugby union player
 Chris Scannell (born 1977), Northern Ireland footballer
 Damian Scannell (born 1985), English footballer
 Denis Scannell (fl. 1890s), Irish hurler
 John Scannell (fl. 1900s), American coach of gridiron football
 Mick Scannell (born 1949), Irish Gaelic footballer
 Niall Scannell (born 1992), Irish rugby union player
 Rory Scannell (born 1993), Irish rugby union player
 Sean Scannell (born 1990), Irish footballer
 Tim Scannell (contemporary), American college baseball coach
 Timothy Scannell (1882–1939), Australian cricketer
 Tom Scannell (1925–1993), Irish footballer

Other fields
 David John Scannell (1875–1923), United States Marine and Medal of Honor recipient
 Herb Scannell (born 1957),  Puerto Rican-American media executive
 Matt Scannell (born 1970), American singer and founding member of Vertical Horizon
 Maura Scannell (1924–2011), Irish botanist
 Richard Scannell (1845–1916), Irish-born Roman Catholic bishop in the United States
 Vernon Scannell (1922–2007), British poet and author
 Yvonne Scannell (contemporary), Irish professor of environmental law

Other uses
 David Scannell, steam-powered fireboat of the San Francisco Fire Department from 1909 to 1954
 J. J. Scannell, American publishing company (c. 1917)

Etymology
The surname Scannell (Irish: Ó Scannail or Ó Scanaill) derives from the Irish word scannal (Old Irish scandal from Latin scandalum). There were originally three quite distinct septs or clans, the first sept being the Ó Scannail, who belonged to West Munster and specifically the Counties of Cork, Kerry, Limerick, and Clare, with Ballyscanlan in County Clare deriving its name from the sept. The clan of Scannell were a sept of the Eóganachta. Scannell was a sept of some significance and it is recorded that in 1014, Eocha, son of Dunadbach, Chief of Clann Scannail, and Scannail son of Cathal, Lord of Eóganacht Locha Léin, were killed at the Battle of Clontarf.

The Eóganachta were an Irish dynasty centred on Cashel which dominated southern Ireland from the 7th to the 10th centuries, and following that, in a restricted form, the Kingdom of Desmond, and its offshoot Carbery, well into the 16th century. By tradition the dynasty was founded by Conall Corc but named after his ancestor Éogan, the firstborn son of the semi-mythological 3rd-century king Ailill Aulom. This dynastic clan-name, for it was never in any sense a 'surname,' should more accurately be restricted to those branches of the royal house which descended from Conall Corc, who established Cashel as his royal seat in the late fifth century.

The rule of the Eóganachta in Munster is widely regarded as gentle and more sophisticated in comparison with the other provincial dynasties of Ireland. Not only was Munster the wealthiest of the provinces, but the Eóganachta were willing to concede other previously powerful kingdoms whom they had politically marginalized, such as the Corcu Loígde, considerable status and freedom from tribute, based on their former status as rulers of the province. See Byrne 2001 for an extensive description of the kingdom.

The first recorded spelling of the family name is shown to be that of Máel Patraic Ua Scannail (also called Patrick O'Scannell), and dated 1262 - 1272, when he was Bishop of Raphoe and afterwards of Armagh.

References